Gujarat alcohol poisonings may refer to 
 2009 Gujarat alcohol poisonings
 2022 Gujarat toxic liquor deaths